I kveld med YLVIS ("Tonight with Ylvis") is a Norwegian talk show hosted by Bård and Vegard Ylvisåker, with Calle Hellevang-Larsen as a permanent sidekick. During season 2 Calle was replaced by David Batra due to obligations he had made with his comedy group Raske Menn and their show on the rival channel TV2. Magnus Devold is also a permanent part of the show and often contributes with several segments per show.

The show has several regular segments like "Hyss i Småland" (Pranks in Småland) where they do various pranks dressed as 19th century farmers, mimicking the style of Emil i Lönneberga, and "Kan dette brukes som vann-ski?" ("Can this be used as waterskis?").

Production
The first season of the show was produced by Funkerhauser Productions, a company owned by comedians Harald Eia and Bård Tufte Johansen, who also have a show on the same channel. In the spring of 2012 the Ylvis-brothers and their manager Jørgen Thue started the production company Concorde TV, which produced seasons 2, 3 and 4 of the show. 
The first 3 seasons of I kveld med Ylvis were taped at Riksscenen in Oslo with a live audience. Starting with season 4 the show is broadcast live from the Folketeatret in Oslo.

Regular skits
"Voice-controlled" elevators, and ATMs
Bård and Vegard use microphones and a keyboard to mimic the sound of a digital voice, controlling various stuff like ATMs and elevators. Often they use quizzes or deliberately misunderstand various words or numbers, like in the amount the customer wants withdrawn. The skit has become a favorite and also gained popularity as viral video, with many countries asking for rights to the skit. This was a continuation of a segment they once did called "Radio-Taxi", where passengers would hear improvised songs about themselves on the radio.

"Trapped in IKEA"
Using a fake room that slides in front of the door, random people get trapped in IKEA exhibits. An accomplice also hides in a closet, and goes out pretending like there is nothing changed, and then disappears back into the closet. After a while the fake room is removed, and often the accomplice gets asked to show where the exit is, and then shows them the newly reopened door. The fake room has also contained a man "using" the toilet once.

Big in-
Two series has featured the boys trying to make it big in various places in the world for comic effect. First they tried to make it big in Kyrgyzstan and ended with appearances on national television in a morning show. The song "Janym" gained mild popularity in Kyrgyzstan, and a slight revival amongst Russian speakers after the success of "The Fox". In season 3 Bård, Vegard, and eventually Magnus tried to make it big as actors in Swahiliwood, a large sub-Saharan movie industry, calculating that they could reach out to hundreds of millions of potential viewers. In the end the boys were invited to introduce an award in the Swahiliwood equivalent of the Academy awards.

Reception
Season 1 of the talk show received good reviews and the premiere attracted 458,000 viewers, whilst the second series only attracted 341,000 viewers on the premiere. The third series set a record with 534,000 viewers, well helped by the success of "The Fox".

I kveld med Ylvis was awarded with the best show TV/Film at the Norwegian Comedy Awards 2012.

List of episodes

Season 1
Average viewership: 334,000

Season 2
Average viewership: 247,000

Season 3
Calle Hellevang Larsen returned as the brothers' sidekick.

Average viewership: 324,000

Season 4
Average viewership: 442,000 (viewership record)

Season 5 
On 4 June 2015 Ylvis announced on their official Facebook page, that a new season would start in the fall.

References

External links

2011 Norwegian television series debuts
Norwegian television talk shows
TVNorge original programming
2010s Norwegian television series